Marek Kowalczyk (born 28 June 1961) is a former Polish footballer. Born in Kolobrzeg, Kowalczyk started his footballing career with Wisła Tczew, rising through the youth teams before playing for the first team. He is mostly known for his spell with Lechia Gdańsk with whom he won the Polish Cup, the Polish SuperCup, and became Lechia's first ever goalscorer in a European competition scoring against Juventus F.C., all three achieved in 1983. In total Kowalczyk spent 5 seasons with Lechia, winning promotion from the third tier to the top tier during his short spell. He played a total of 116 games and scored 20 goals in all competitions.

Honours
Lechia Gdańsk

Polish Cup
Winners: 1983

Polish SuperCup
Winners: 1983

II liga (western group)
Winners: 1983–84

III liga (group II)
Winners: 1982–83

References

1961 births
Living people
Lechia Gdańsk players
Polish footballers
Association football forwards
People from Kołobrzeg